Marden High School is a coeducational secondary school located in Cullercoats, Tyne and Wear, England. The Marden City Learning Centre, opened 15 July 2003, is situated on the grounds in front of the school.

In 2015 the school began building a new school building through the Priority Schools Building Programme. This was completed in 2016. The older building was demolished and replaced with a car park and field. This work was fully completed in 2017.

Notable former pupils
David Bradley - award-winning science journalist and author of the book Deceived Wisdom
Chris Day - hepatologist, and Vice-Chancellor of Newcastle University from 2017.
Andrew Dunn - stage, film and television actor
Andy Ogle - professional Mixed Martial Artist, Featherweight for the UFC
Andy Taylor - guitarist with Duran Duran
Carol Malia - BBC Look North flagship presenter
Chloe Ferry - Geordie Shore
Marion Fawkes - Former world, European and EU race walking champion. Former world record holder for 3k,5k, & 10k race walks.
Ross Welford - Children's author.

References

External links
Marden High School

Secondary schools in the Metropolitan Borough of North Tyneside
Foundation schools in the Metropolitan Borough of North Tyneside